Crying on the Bathroom Floor is the eighth studio album by British singer Will Young. It was released on 6 August 2021 through Cooking Vinyl. An album of cover versions of songs by female artists, it includes lead single "Daniel" (originally recorded by Bat for Lashes) which did not enter the Official UK Top 100 Chart but peaked at number 31 on the Official Singles Sales Chart Top 100, "Elizabeth Taylor" (originally by Clare Maguire) and the title track "Crying on the Bathroom Floor" (originally by MUNA).

Background
Following his previous album, Lexicon, released in 2019, Young wanted to highlight female artists he admired, saying, "After 18 years of recording and performing a lot of original material, I loved the idea of creating an album that celebrates some of the modern female artists I so admire in pop. In today’s times it's so much easier and accepted to occupy other genders, ideas and explore new avenues. I wanted to understand what it might be like to sing their lyrics; a song about a boy called Daniel; crying on the bathroom floor, feeling like Elizabeth Taylor. This is not a covers album as such, well certainly not in the standard way. I wanted to bring songs from female artists who I admire into a new arena. I wanted to work with Richard X again and create a true pop record."

Critical reception

David Smyth from Evening Standard found that "leftfield pop artists such as Muna, Lykke Li and Sky Ferreira deserve the wider attention they may get from Young making their music more Radio 2 friendly. In most cases, with the help of regular production collaborator Richard X, he's made electronic originals sound a bit more organic, with lots of piano, a bit of guitar and his high, sad, soulful voice [...] If this album serves to direct his mainstream fanbase towards the superior originals, it will have done a worthwhile job. Roisin O'Connor remarked that "the fact he is able to celebrate his sexuality now means these songs transcend the bog-standard cover version and become something far more moving [...] It's testament to Young’s emotional maturity, along with his pop savvy, that this does stand as an album in its own right."

Track listing
All tracks produced by Richard X.

Charts

Release history

References

Will Young albums
2021 albums